Mario Leuenberg (born 27 December 1923) was a Chilean equestrian. He competed in two events at the 1952 Summer Olympics.

References

External links
 

1923 births
Possibly living people
Chilean male equestrians
Olympic equestrians of Chile
Equestrians at the 1952 Summer Olympics
Pan American Games medalists in equestrian
Pan American Games bronze medalists for Chile
Equestrians at the 1955 Pan American Games
Place of birth missing (living people)
Medalists at the 1955 Pan American Games
20th-century Chilean people
21st-century Chilean people